The Endine Stakes is an American Thoroughbred horse race held annually in mid September at Delaware Park Racetrack in Stanton, Delaware. A Grade III six furlong sprint on dirt, the race is open to fillies and mares age three and older.

Inaugurated in 1971, the race was named in honor of Endine, a filly owned by Jane du Pont Lunger who won back-to-back runnings of the Delaware Handicap in 1958 and 1959.

There was no race run from 1983 through 1995.

Winners since 1996

Earlier winners

1982 - Wading Power
1981 - Veiled Look
1980 - Candy Éclair
1979 - Quatre Saisons
1978 - Dainty Dotsie
1977 - My Juliet
1976 - Donetta
1975 - Honky Star
1974 - Miss Rebound
1973 - Light Hearted
1972 - Main Pan
1971 - Royal Signal

References
 The 2009 Endine Stakes at Bloodhorse.com

Graded stakes races in the United States
Horse races in Delaware
Sprint category horse races for fillies and mares
Recurring sporting events established in 1971
Delaware Park Racetrack
1971 establishments in Delaware